Titran is a village in the municipality of Frøya in Trøndelag county, Norway. The Sletringen Lighthouse is located on a small islet off the coast of Titran. The village is centered on fishing and fish farming and in 2017, there were 105 residents. Titran Chapel is located in the village.

Titran is also known for its windmill energy production. It is the site of the first wind energy production in Norway. Two windmills were built near the village in 1986.

Hallvar Witzø's film Everybody hates Johan (2022) is set in Titran.

References

Frøya, Trøndelag
Villages in Trøndelag